The Northumberland County Show is an annual agricultural show which takes place in May in Northumberland, England.

In 2019 the show had an attendance of just over 23,000 visitors.

The 2020 and 2021 shows were cancelled due to the coronavirus pandemic.

References

External links
 Northumberland County Show (official website).

Northumberland
Agricultural shows in England
Bywell